Hangu Pass or Hanguguan is a pass separating the upper Yellow River and Wei valleys—the cradle of Chinese civilization and seat of its longtime capital Xi'an—from the fertile North China Plain. It lies on the south bank of the Yellow River just east of its eastward bend out of the Ordos Loop at Tong Pass in Shaanxi. It was the site of many battles during the Warring States and early imperial eras, when it was the chokepoint shielding Qin, Guanzhong, or Luoyang from outside attack. The term Hangu Pass refers to two locations: the Qin dynasty Hangu Pass in Hanguguan Town, Lingbao county, Sanmenxia city, Henan and secondly, the Han dynasty Hangu Pass in Xin’an county, Luoyang city, Henan. In 2014, the archeological site was recognized by UNESCO as part of the “Silk Roads: the Routes Network of Chang'an-Tianshan Corridor” World Heritage Site.

History
Chinese legend states that Lao-tzu wrote his Tao Te Ching at the insistence of Yinxi, an astrologer and the guard at Hangu Pass, before leaving for the west.

The state of Qin fortified the pass in 361BC as its eastern border, protecting access to their homeland from the armies of the other Warring States competing to succeed the Zhou. It continued to protect the Guanzhong area of the Qin and Western Han empires. Under the Eastern Han that succeeded Wang Mang's "Xin dynasty", its fortifications protected the capital Luoyang in the other direction, staving off attacks coming from the west and northwest.

After the fall of the Han and rise of the Three Kingdoms, the Hangu Pass lost most of its importance as the primary fortifications moved a little west to Tong Pass.

Discovery of Han dynasty Hangu Pass site 
Between 2012 and 2013 a team from the Luoyang Cultural Relics and Archaeological Institution conducted an archaeological excavation at the site in Xin'an, Luoyang, on an area of more than 3,000 square meters. This excavation brought several roads, platforms and walls to light.
Today, the archaeological site of the Hangu Pass in Xin’an is a museum park.

Hangu Pass in fiction 
In Kingdom manga and anime, this pass was the last chokepoint that Li Mu and his 5 allied Coalition Army needed to overcome in order to defeat Qin. Their attacks were repelled with great losses, forcing Li Mu to make a decision of attacking Xianyang via Zui.

See also
 Sanmenxia
 Tong Pass 
 Wu Pass

References

Mountain passes of China
Landforms of Henan